Shibinraj Kunniyil (born 20 March 1993) is an Indian professional footballer who plays as a goalkeeper for Gokulam Kerala in the I-League.

Early career
Shibinraj was included in a 23-day preparatory camp for India U19 national team held in China in the year of 2010.

Career

Mohun Bagan
On April 20, 2017 Shibinraj made his debut for Mohun Bagan in the AFC Cup match against Maziya S&RC. Mohun Bagan went down by one goal in that match.

On April 30, 2017 Shibinraj made his I-League debut when he came in as substitute for Debjit Majumder in a match against Chennai City FC in the 82nd minute of the match.

On August 5, 2017 Mohun Bagan Announced that they have retained the services of Shibinraj for 2017-18 Season. Shibinraj started for Mohun Bagan in CFL and Sikkim Governors Gold Cup. He also started against FC Goa in a Pre-Season Friendly took place at the Jawaharlal Nehru stadium in Goa.

Gokulam Kerala FC
Gokulam Kerala FC signed Shibinraj for the 2018-19 season and he had his opening game against his former club Mohun Baganin the I-League on October 27 at EMS Corporation Stadium in Kozhikode;Gokulam Kerala FC drew the match and Shibinraj was applauded for his efforts in front of goal. He kept his first team place and played in the other matches also for Gokulam Kerala FC

Kerala Blasters FC 
Kerala Blasters FC signed Shibinraj for the 2019-20 season as the third goalkeeper for the club. But he not feature in a single game for the club in the senior team. On 25 September 2020, Kerala Blasters FC released Shibinraj as his contract came to an end.

References

External links 
 

Indian footballers
1993 births
Living people
I-League players
Footballers from Kerala
Association football goalkeepers
Kerala Blasters FC players
Gokulam Kerala FC players
Mohun Bagan AC players
Churchill Brothers FC Goa players
Indian Super League players
Sreenidi Deccan FC players
Sportspeople from Kozhikode